J. Robert Harris (September 27, 1925 – February 13, 2000) was an American composer, notably of the 1967 Spider-Man television series theme song "Spider-Man". He is also credited with writing the theme for the film Lolita in 1962.

He was born in New York City and died in Westbury, New York, at the age of 74. His brother is the director, producer and screenwriter James B. Harris.

References

1925 births
2000 deaths
20th-century classical musicians
20th-century American composers
American film score composers
American television composers
American male film score composers
Male television composers
Musicians from New York City
Songwriters from New York (state)
20th-century American male musicians
American male songwriters